Marzouq Al-Muwallad (born August 6, 1992 in Medina, Saudi Arabia) is a Saudi Arabian professional basketball player.  He currently plays for the Al-Ansar Sports Club of the Saudi Premier League. 

He has been a member of Saudi Arabia's national basketball team on many occasions. At the 2013 FIBA Asia Championship, he was Saudi Arabia's best passer and stealer.

He was the match-winner in the game against Thailand, when he scored 20 points and handed out 10 assists.

External links
 Asia-basket.com Profile

References

1992 births
Living people
Saudi Arabian men's basketball players
People from Medina
Point guards
Basketball players at the 2014 Asian Games
Asian Games competitors for Saudi Arabia
20th-century Saudi Arabian people
21st-century Saudi Arabian people